Sailor Beware may refer to:

 Sailors, Beware!, a 1927 silent film starring Laurel and Hardy
 Sailor, Beware!, a 1933 Broadway play by Kenyon Nicholson and Charles Robinson
 Sailor Beware (1952 film), featuring Jerry Lewis and Dean Martin
 Sailor Beware! (play), a 1954 play by Philip King and Falkland Cary
 Sailor Beware! (1956 film), a British comedy starring Peggy Mount and Shirley Eaton, an adaptation of the 1954 play